Francis Brian Shorland  (14 July 1909 – 8 June 1999) was a New Zealand organic chemist.

Biography
After a BSc and a MSc in organic chemistry he worked for the Department of Scientific and Industrial Research, before earning a scholarship to go to the University of Liverpool for a PhD under Thomas Percy Hilditch, studying fish liver oils and fats from farm animals.

After his retirement in 1969, he held several honorary posts at Victoria University of Wellington. He died on 8 June 1999 and was cremated at Karori Crematorium.

Honours and awards 
He was awarded a DSc by the University of Liverpool in 1950 and an honorary DSc by Victoria University of Wellington in 1970; a Fellowship of the Royal Society of New Zealand in 1951 and the Hector Medal in 1955. In the 1959 New Year Honours he was appointed an Officer of the Order of the British Empire, in recognition of his role as director of the Fats Research Institute, and in 1990 he received the New Zealand 1990 Commemoration Medal.

Shorland Medal 

In 1999 the New Zealand Association of Scientists established the Shorland Medal in Shorland's honour. It is awarded annually in recognition of a "major and continued contribution to basic or applied research that has added significantly to scientific understanding or resulted in significant benefits to society."

References

Further reading 

 Cameron, Joan (2014). Brian Shorland : Doyen of New Zealand science 

1909 births
1999 deaths
Organic chemists
New Zealand chemists
People associated with Department of Scientific and Industrial Research (New Zealand)
Alumni of the University of Liverpool
Victoria University of Wellington alumni
Academic staff of the Victoria University of Wellington
New Zealand Officers of the Order of the British Empire
Fellows of the Royal Society of New Zealand
20th-century New Zealand scientists